Carl or Karl Stevens may refer to:

Carl H. Stevens Jr. (1929–2008), American clergyman
Carl Stevens (wrestler)
Carl Stevens, orchestrator in 1950s for artists including Nick Noble
Karl Stevens (born 1978), novelist and painter

See also
Carl Steven (1974–2011), American actor